David Finckel (born December 6, 1951) is an American cellist and influential figure in the classical music world. The cellist for the Emerson String Quartet from 1979 to 2013, Finckel is currently the co-artistic director of the Chamber Music Society of Lincoln Center in New York, co-founder of the independent record label ArtistLed, co-artistic director and co-founder of Music@Menlo in Silicon Valley, producer of Cello Talks, professor of cello at the Juilliard School, and visiting professor of music at Stony Brook University.

Career
Born into a family of cellists, David Finckel began his musical studies with his father, Edwin Finckel, a leading jazz musician of the Big Band Era. Growing up in Madison, New Jersey, he started studying music with his father at the age of five, and at ten took up the cello.

At the age of 15 he made his debut with the Philadelphia Orchestra in Tchaikovsky's Rococo Variations as winner of the orchestra's junior competition, and two years later returned to capture the senior division prize and another appearance with the orchestra, playing the Schumann Concerto. Formative experiences also included his early contacts with Alexander and Mischa Schneider, with Felix Galimir through the New York String Orchestra, and with prominent musicians of the Philadelphia Orchestra through his teacher, co-principal cellist Elsa Hilger.

At 17, David played for Mstislav Rostropovich, and soon after became the great cellist's first American pupil. His studies spanned a nine-year period, culminating in a performance of Prokofiev's Sinfonia Concertante with the Basel Symphony under Rostropovich's direction. Finckel was the first winner of the New England Conservatory Piatigorsky Artist Award, chosen from an international field for his excellence as soloist, chamber musician, and teacher. In 1979, he became a member of the award-winning Emerson String Quartet.

Finckel performs and records frequently in collaboration with pianist Wu Han, whom he married in 1985. Since the 1990s, the two artists have toured widely year-round and have emerged as one of the most popular cello-piano duos on the musical scene today, appearing on the major chamber series in the United States and abroad. Finckel and Wu Han also often appear in concert with violinist Philip Setzer.

Recent appearances as orchestral soloist include Elgar's Cello Concerto with the Slovenia Symphony Orchestra, Shostakovich's First Concerto and the Beethoven Triple Concerto with the Philadelphia Orchestra and the Los Angeles Chamber Orchestra, as well as performances and recordings of the Dvořák Concerto and Augusta Read Thomas's Ritual Incantations with the Taipei Symphony Orchestra, John Harbison's Cello Concerto with the Albany Symphony Orchestra, and Haydn's Concerto in C Major with the Louisiana Philharmonic Orchestra.

Emerson String Quartet
In the spring of 1979, Finckel attended the Alice Tully Hall debut of his new friends, the Emerson String Quartet, and was soon asked to join the ensemble.  Finckel's first concert with the quartet was in his birthplace: Allentown, Pennsylvania, on October 6, 1979.

As a member of the Emerson String Quartet from 1979 to 2013, Finckel participated in over 30 acclaimed recordings on the Deutsche Grammophon label since 1987, was the recipient of nine Grammy Awards (including two for Best Classical Album, three Gramophone Awards, the coveted Avery Fisher Prize, Musical America's “Ensemble of the Year” and cycles of the complete Beethoven, Bartók, Mendelssohn and Shostakovich string quartets in the world's musical capitals. Finckel ended his tenure with the quartet at the conclusion of the 2012–13 season. He was replaced by Paul Watkins.[5]The other members of the ensemble include violinists Eugene Drucker and Philip Setzer who alternate in the first chair position and violist Lawrence Dutton.[4]

ArtistLed
In addition to his distinction as an accomplished performer, David Finckel has established a reputation for his dynamic and innovative approach to the recording studio. In 1997, he and pianist Wu Han launched ArtistLed, classical music's first musician-directed and Internet-based recording company, whose catalog of twenty-three albums has won widespread acclaim.  BBC Music Magazine saluted the launch by featuring the company's debut album on the cover. David Finckel is a controlling participant in every aspect of the recording process, from selecting the repertoire and recording venue to setting the sound, running the sessions, constructing the edits, and determining the final mix. ArtistLed's Grammy-award-winning recording engineer is Da-Hong Seetoo.

Music@Menlo
In 2003, Finckel co-founded Music@Menlo with pianist Wu Han, an annual chamber music festival and institute in Silicon Valley that brings to the San Francisco Bay Area a lineup of accomplished musicians, scholars, educators, and musicologists, as well as a roster of gifted young artists, for an immersive three-week chamber music experience in the summer.

The $2.2 million annual budget supports over sixty-five public events each year; total annual attendance now exceeds 13,000 with free program attendance exceeding 6,000; nearly 300 artists have come from all over the world to perform in the main-stage concerts, lead multimedia Encounter lectures, coach students of the Chamber Music Institute, and work with Menlo School students in the annual Winter Residency; 477 Chamber Music Institute participants have enrolled in the program to date; and 318 interns have gained real-world professional experience from Music@Menlo's industry-leading Arts Administration Internship Program.

Finckel was instrumental in the formation of Music@Menlo's live recording series, Music@Menlo LIVE, which commercially releases live recordings from the festival each year. The label was launched in 2004 and has been praised as "probably the most ambitious recording project of any classical music festival in the world" (San Jose Mercury News). Over 130 live recordings have been released to date.

Performances from the festival air nationwide on American Public Media's Performance Today, the largest daily classical music program in the United States, which airs on 260 stations and reaches more than one million people each week.

In 2002, David Finckel developed and trademarked AudioNotes, an innovative complement to program notes. The listener guides are designed to offer audiences engaging introductions to many of the concert programs presented over the years.

The Chamber Music Society of Lincoln Center
In 2004, Finckel and Wu Han were appointed Co-Artistic Directors of the Chamber Music Society of Lincoln Center in New York City, where they currently present around 200 concerts, lectures, master classes, and outreach events each season. The Chamber Music Society is recognized as one of the leaders in the field of chamber music in North America. In 2021, Finckel & Wu Han extended their appointment through 2027, making them the longest serving artistic directors in Chamber Music Society history.

Since becoming Co-Artistic directors, the projects they have directed and initiated include: programming the CMS seasons; expansion of the Bowers Program (formerly known as CMS Two); the creation and growth of CMS recording labels; international partnerships and expanded touring; establishing performance and educational residencies across the United States; commissioning more than 50 new works by emerging and established composers; and awarding of CMS’s Stoeger Prize for composition; creation and expansion of the CMS’s online presence via live-streaming; expanded national radio broadcasts to 52 shows per year; and the creation of new series such as Late Night Rose and the Quartet Series.

They have also directed their attention to expanding the organization's activities internationally with the establishment of residencies and concert series, including the Mecklenburg–Vorpommern Festspiele in Germany; Wigmore Hall in London; Teatro Mayor in Bogota, Colombia; and Bach Inspiration in Taipei, Taiwan.

In the United States, the residencies they have established include the Isabella Stewart Gardner Museum in Boston, MA; Harris Theater in Chicago, IL; St. Cecilia Music Center in Grand Rapids, MI; the University of Georgia in Athens, GA; the Performing Arts Center at Purchase College in Purchase, NY;Saratoga Performing Arts Center in Saratoga Springs, NY; the Chrysalis Chamber Music Institute at the University of North Carolina School of the Arts in Winston-Salem, NC;and Shaker Village in Pleasant Hill, KY.

Educational Activities
For two decades, with the Emerson String Quartet, Finckel taught at the University of Hartford's Hartt School.[15] Finckel joined the faculty of Stony Brook University in 2002 as a member of the Emerson String Quartet; today he continues to coach chamber music there, lead master classes, and provide instrumental instruction. He is also on the faculty of the Juilliard School since 2012.

Finckel has presented master classes at venerable institutions throughout the world and for many years taught alongside the late Isaac Stern at Carnegie Hall and the Jerusalem Music Centre. He participates in various educational outreach programs across the country.

With pianist Wu Han, David Finckel created the Chamber Music Institute at Music@Menlo in 2004. The institute offers a rigorous professional training ground and a wide array of performance opportunities to gifted young musicians who have been selected from conservatories, youth orchestras, and music programs nationally and internationally .

In 2009, under the auspices of the Chamber Music Society of Lincoln Center, Finckel and his wife established a chamber music training workshop for young artists in Korea and Taiwan, intensive residency programs designed to bring student musicians into contact with an elite faculty of artists including pianist Leon Fleisher and violinist Arnold Steinhardt and have been instrumental in the expansion of the society's Bowers program (formerly CMS Two) that invites outstanding young musicians from around the world through audition to join the CMS artist roster for an extended residency that includes both performance and educational outreach opportunities. Under his leadership, the residency program has expanded from two to three years and has greatly increased the level of participation of these young artists.

Personal life
David Finckel divides his time between New York City and Westchester County with his wife and musical partner, pianist Wu Han. They have one daughter, Lilian Finckel.

Discography 
 Bach, Mendelssohn, Debussy, Britten (2018)
 Wu Han LIVE II (2016)
 Romantic Piano Quartets (Brahms, Schumann, Mahler) on Deutsche Grammaphon with Daniel Hope, Paul Neubauer and Wu Han (2015)
 Dvorak/Thomas (2015 re-release of 2003 Cello Classics CD)
 Wu Han LIVE (2014)
 Dvorak Piano Trios with Philip Setzer and David Finckel (2012)
 Mendelssohn: The Piano Trios with Philip Setzer and David Finckel (2012)
 Clarinet Trios with David Shifrin and David Finckel (2011)
 For David and Wu Han (contemporary works composed for David Finckel and Wu Han) (2010)
 Schubert Piano Trios with Philip Setzer and David Finckel (2008)
 CMS Studio Recordings: Elgar and Walton (2007)
 CMS Studio Recordings: Beethoven and Dvořák (2007)
 DG Concerts: Bartok/Dvořák (2007)
 Brahms Sonatas (2005)
 Schubert Sonatas (2004)
 Edwin Finckel: Music For Cello (2001)
 Russian Classics (2001)
 Beethoven: Complete Works for Piano & Cello (1998)
 Sonatas by Strauss, Franck, and Finckel (1997)
 Sonatas by Tchaikovsky and Kodály with Da-Hong Seetoo and David Finckel (1997)
 Sonatas by Grieg, Schumann, and Chopin (1997)

Emerson String Quartet
 ESQ: Complete Recordings on Deutsche Grammophon (2016)
 Journeys: Tchaikovsky, Schönberg (2013)
 Mozart: The Prussian Quartets (2011)
 Old World-New World (2010)
 Intimate Letters (2009) - GRAMMY AWARD WINNER FOR BEST CHAMBER MUSIC PERFORMANCE
 Bach Fugues (2008)
 BRAHMS: String Quartets (2007)
 The Little Match Girl (2007) - OSCAR NOMINATED SHORT FILM
 Intimate Voices (2006) – GRAMMY AWARD WINNER FOR BEST CHAMBER MUSIC PERFORMANCE
 Mendelssohn: The Complete String Quartets  (2005) - WINNER OF 2 GRAMMY AWARDS INCLUDING BEST CHAMBER MUSIC PERFORMANCE
 Haydn: The Seven Last Words of our Savior on the Cross, Op. 51 (2004)
 Bach: The Art of Fugue, BWV 1080 (2003)
 The Emerson Encores (2002)
 The Haydn Project (2004)
 Shostakovich: The String Quartets (complete) (2000) - GRAMMY AWARD WINNER FOR BEST CLASSICAL & BEST CHAMBER PERFORMANCE
 Mozart/Brahms: Clarinet Quintets with David Shifrin (1999)
 Schubert: String Quintet; Late Quartets (1999)
 Music of Curt Cacioppo: "Monsterslayer" (1998)
 Meyer: String Quintet/Rorem: String Quartet No. 4 (1998)
 Beethoven: Key to the Quartets (1997)
 Beethoven: The String Quartets (Complete) (1997) - GRAMMY AWARD WINNER FOR BEST CHAMBER MUSIC PERFORMANCE
 Schumann Piano Quintet Op. 44/ Piano Quartet Op. 47 (1996)
 Webern: Works for String Quartet/String Trio Op. 20 (1995)
 Mozart: String Quartet in G, K. 387; String Quartet in d, K. 421 (1995)
 Dvorák: Quartet in E-flat, Op. 87; Quintet in A, Op. 81 (1994)
 American Contemporaries: Harbison, Wernick, and Schuller (1994)
 American Originals: String Quartets of Ives and Barber (1993) GRAMMY AWARD FOR BEST CHAMBER MUSIC PERFORMANCE
 Schubert: String Quintet in C, D. 956 (1992)
 Prokofiev: String Quartets Nos. 1 & 2/Sonata for 2 Violins (1992)
 Mozart: The Flute Quartets with Carol Wincenc (1992)
 Mozart: The "Haydn" Quartets (complete) (1992)
 Bartók: Complete String Quartets (1990) - GRAMMY AWARD WINNER FOR BEST CLASSICAL AND BEST CHAMBER MUSIC PERFORAMCE
 Beethoven: Quartet in f, Op. 95; Schubert: Quartet No. 14 in d, D. 810 "Death and the Maiden" (1990)
 Brahms: Quartet No. 1 in c, Op. 51; Schumann: Quartet in A, Op. 41, No. 3 (1990)
 Mozart: Quartet in B-flat, K. 458 "Hunt"; Quartet in C, K. 465 "Dissonance"; Haydn: Quartet in C, Op. 76, No. 3 "Emperor (1990)
 Tchaikovsky: Quartet No. 1 in D, Op. 11; Borodin: Quartet No. 2 in D (1990)
 Debussy: Quartet in g, Op. 10; Ravel: Quartet in F (1990)
 Dvorák: Quartet No. 12 in F, Op. 96 "American"; Smetana: Quartet No. 1 in e, "From My Life" (1990)
 Beethoven: Quartet in F, Op. 135; Schubert: Quartet in G, D. 887 (1990)
 Imbrie: Quartet No. 4; Schuller: Quartet No. 2 (1990)
 Cowell: Quartet Euphometric; Harris: Three Variations on a Theme (Quartet No. 2); Shepherd: Triptych for Soprano and String Quartet with Betsy Norden (1990)
 Piston: Concerto for String Quartet, Winds and Percussion (1990)

References

External links
Classical Archives Interview with Wu Han

1951 births
Living people
American cellists
Aspen Music Festival and School faculty
University of Hartford Hartt School faculty